Cao Zhenyong (1755–1835) was a Chinese statesman of the Qing dynasty. He served in a leading position in the Grand Council under the Daoguang Emperor. He is widely believed to be responsible for the formalized style of government, which was promoted under the Daoguang Emperor's reign and contributed to the emperor's failure to reform the increasingly corrupt administration of the Qing Empire.

References

Qing dynasty politicians from Anhui
1755 births
1835 deaths
Politicians from Huangshan
Grand Councillors of the Qing dynasty
Grand Secretaries of the Qing dynasty
Assistant Grand Secretaries
People from She County, Anhui